The NWA Mountain State Heavyweight Championship is a professional wrestling championship that serves as a championship for the National Wrestling Alliance, under the promotion Mountain State Wrestling.

Title history

See also
List of National Wrestling Alliance championships

Notes

References
General

Specific

External links
Official NWA MSW Site

National Wrestling Alliance championships
Regional professional wrestling championships